The Kentucky Futurity is a stakes race for three-year-old trotters, held annually at The Red Mile in Lexington, Kentucky since 1893. It is part of the Triple Crown of Harness Racing for Trotters.

In the 2007 race, Donato Hanover's winning time of 1:51.1 set the world record for a 1-mile trotting horse.

In winning the 2016 running of the Kentucky Futurity, Marion Marauder became the ninth horse from 124 runnings to win the Triple Crown of Harness Racing for Trotters.

Winners of the Kentucky Futurity

2022 - Rebuff-1.50,3 (Muscle Hill)
2021 - Jujubee
2020 - Amigo Volo-1.51,0 (Father Patrick)
2019 - Greenshoe-1.51,1 (Father Patrick )
2018 - Six Pack-1.49,1 (Muscle Mass )
2017 - Snowstorm Hanover-1.53,2 (Muscle Massive)
2016 - Marion Marauder-1.52,3 (Muscle Hill)
2015 - Pinkman
2014 - Nuncio
2013 - Creatine
2012 - My MVP
2011 - Manofmanymissions
2010 - Wishing Stone
2009 - Muscle Hill
2008 - Deweycheatumnhowe
2007 - Donato Hanover
2006 - Glidemaster
2005 - Strong Yankee
2004 - Windsong's Legacy
2003 - Mr. Muscleman
2002 - Like a Prayer
2001 - Chasing Tail
2000 - Credit Winner
1999 - Self Possessed
1998 - Trade Balance
1997 - Take Chances
1996 - Running Sea
1995 - CR Track Master
1994 - Bullville Victory
1993 - Pine Chip
1992 - Armbro Keepsake
1991 - Whiteland Janice
1990 - Star Mystic
1989 - Peace Corps
1988 - Huggie Hanover
1987 - Napoletano
1986 - Sugarcane Hanover
1985 - Flak Bait
1984 - Fancy Crown
1983 - Power Seat
1982 - Jazz Cosmos
1981 - Filet of Sole
1980 - Final Score
1979 - Classical Way
1978 - Doublemint
1977 - Texas
1976 - Quick Pay
1975 - Noble Rogue
1974 - Waymaker
1973 - Arnie Almahurst
1972 - Super Bowl
1971 - Savoir
1970 - Timothy T
1969 - Lindy's Pride
1968 - Nevele Pride
1967 - Speed Model
1966 - Governor Armbro
1965 - Armbro Flight
1964 - Ayres
1963 - Speedy Scot
1962 - Safe Mission
1961 - Duke Rodney
1960 - Elaine Rodney
1959 - Diller Hanover
1958 - Emily's Pride
1957 - Cassin Hanover
1956 - Nimble Colby
1955 - Scott Frost
1954 - Harlan
1953 - Kimberly Kid
1952 - Sharp Note
1951 - Ford Hanover
1950 - Star's Pride
1949 - Bangaway
1948 - Egan Hanover
1947 - Hoot Mon
1946 - Victory Song
1941 - Bill Gallon
1940 - Spencer Scott
1939 - Peter Astra
1938 - McLin Hanover
1937 - Twilight Song
1936 - Rosalind
1935 - Lawrence Hanover
1934 - Princess Peg
1933 - Meda
1932 - The Marchioness
1931 - The Protector
1930 - Hanover's Bertha
1929 - Walter Dear
1928 - Spencer
1927 - Iosola's Worthy
1926 - Guy McKinney
1925 - Aileen Guy
1924 - Mr McElwyn
1923 - Ethelinda
1922 - Lee Worthy
1921 - Rose Scott
1920 - Arion Guy
1919 - Periscope
1918 - Nella Dillon
1917 - The Real Lady
1916 - Volga
1915 - Mary Putney
1914 - Peter Volo
1913 - Etowah
1912 - Manrico B
1911 - Peter Thompson
1910 - Grace
1909 - Baroness Virginia
1908 - The Harvester
1907 - General Watts
1906 - Siliko
1905 - Miss Adbell
1904 - Grace Bond
1903 - Sadie Mac
1902 - Nella Jay
1901 - Peter Sterling
1900 - Fereno
1899 - Boralma
1898 - Peter the Great
1897 - Thorn
1896 - Rose Croix
1895 - Oakland Baron
1894 - Beuzetta
1893 - Oro Wilkes

External links
 Kentucky Quarter Horse Association
 The Red Mile

References

 
Harness races in the United States
Harness races for three-year-old trotters
United States Triple Crown of Harness Racing
Recurring sporting events established in 1893
Sports in Kentucky
1893 establishments in Kentucky